The Amity Foundation is an independent Chinese voluntary organization.  it is the largest charity in China. It was created in 1985 on the initiative of Christians in China with the late Bishop K. H. Ting as its founder. Its main objective has been to help develop poorer areas of the country. Amity's headquarters are in Nanjing. The organization includes the Amity Printing Company (APC, also sometimes called Amity Printing Press), the largest Bible producer in China. Amity Printing Company opened a branch in Ethiopia in 2016. Amity Foundation has an office in Hong Kong and opened a liaison office in the Ecumenical Center of the World Council of Churches in Geneva in 2017.

Ideals

Some have described Amity as a faith-initiated organization that works with Christians, while others, such as the current General Secretary Qiu Zhonghui, has described it as a faith-based organization. Various partner organizations have praised the work and activity of the charity. Recently the charitable organisation has been highlighted in both domestic and international media for its action and prompt relief work in China in response to natural disasters.

Activities
Disaster relief
Support of church-run social work
Support of medical education in China's poorest areas
HIV/AIDS awareness and prevention training
Education in the countryside and for the children of migrant workers, including the Amity Teachers Program
Special education (e.g. work with deaf or disabled children)
Taking care of orphans
Environmental protection
Integrated development (e.g. providing basic health care, schooling, clean energy, agricultural skills training and microfinance to a village community)

Amity Printing Company (APC)
The Amity Printing Company (APC) in Nanjing is the largest producer of Bibles in China, and one of the largest in the world. It is a joint venture with the United Bible Societies. In its first year (1988), it printed 500,000 Bibles on a press donated by UBS. Since 1988, it has published Bibles in Mandarin and in several ethnic minority languages, as well as in many other languages for export. It is China's only legal printer of Bibles.

The APC has so far published more than 100 million Bibles. Most of the Bibles printed are the Chinese Union Version (1919), the Chinese Bible translation used by the Protestant churches, or the less commonly accepted but more modern Today's Chinese Version. Recently the Pastoral Bible used by the Catholic churches has also been printed here. All Chinese Bibles are distributed not by the state-run bookstore chains (such as Xinhua Bookstore), but through the network of officially registered Protestant churches.

Since China's adoption of the New Regulations on Religious Affairs in 2018 that banned online bookstores from selling Bibles, the APC has been facing difficulty in printing Chinese Bibles. This has caused a shortage of Catholic Bibles in Hong Kong.

See also
Chinese Bible Translations
Christianity in China
United Bible Societies

Sources

External links 
 

Foundations based in China
Christianity in China
Medical and health organizations based in China
Bible societies